Parker Academy is a private day school in Concord, New Hampshire, United States. Established in 2001, the school serves students in grades 6 through 12.

Campus
The Academy's high school is housed in the former Millville School. The middle school is located in a Victorian building at 33 Pleasant Street in downtown Concord, which has variously housed tutoring services, private college counselling, and a specialist speech and drama school.

Curriculum
Parker Academy offers a curriculum that meets state guidelines. Further, the school is approved to provide programs for students with ADD, ADHD, autism, dyslexia, emotional disturbance (mild depression and anxiety disorders), non-verbal learning disabilities, and speech and language disabilities.

Extracurricular activities
An outdoor Adventure Program is available to students.

References

External links
 

Schools in Concord, New Hampshire
Educational institutions established in 2001
Private high schools in New Hampshire
Private middle schools in New Hampshire
2001 establishments in New Hampshire